Rho Andromedae, Latinized from ρ Andromedae, is the Bayer designation for a star in the northern constellation of Andromeda. It has an apparent visual magnitude of +5.19, which, according to the Bortle Dark-Sky Scale, is bright enough to be seen with the naked eye from dark suburban skies. It is drifting further away with a radial velocity of +10 km/s.

The stellar classification of this star is F5IV-V, showing mixed spectral features of a main sequence and subgiant stage. It is about 1.3 billion years old with 3.4 times the girth of the Sun and is spinning with a projected rotational velocity of 44 km/s. The outer envelope is radiating around 18 times the luminosity of the Sun from its photosphere at an effective temperature of 6,471 K, giving it the yellow-white hue of an F-type star. X-ray emissions were detected from this star during the EXOSAT mission.

Naming

References

External links
 Simbad HD 1671
 Image HD 1671

F-type main-sequence stars
F-type subgiants
Andromeda (constellation)
Andromedae, Rho
BD+37 0045
Andromedae, 27
001671
001686
0082